The 2005 Indiana Hoosiers football team represented Indiana University Bloomington during the 2005 NCAA Division I-A football season. They participated as members of the Big Ten Conference. The Hoosiers played their home games at Memorial Stadium in Bloomington, Indiana. The Hoosiers were coached by Terry Hoeppner, who was in his first season.

Schedule

Roster

2006 NFL draftees

References

Indiana
Indiana Hoosiers football seasons
Indiana Hoosiers football